Hyaluronidase-1 is an enzyme that in humans is encoded by the HYAL1 gene.

Function 

This gene encodes a lysosomal hyaluronidase. Hyaluronidases intracellularly degrade hyaluronan, one of the major glycosaminoglycans of the extracellular matrix. Hyaluronan is thought to be involved in cell proliferation, migration and differentiation. This enzyme is active at an acidic pH and is the major hyaluronidase in plasma. Mutations in this gene are associated with mucopolysaccharidosis type IX, or hyaluronidase deficiency. The gene is one of several related genes in a region of chromosome 3p21.3 associated with tumor suppression. Multiple transcript variants encoding different isoforms have been found for this gene.

Structure 
HYAL1 was first purified from human plasma and urine.  The enzyme is 435 amino acids long with a molecular weight of 55-60 kDa.

The crystal structure of HYAL1 was determined by Chao, Muthukumar, and Herzberg.  The enzyme is composed of two closely associated domains: a N-terminal catalytic domain (Phe22-Thr352) and a smaller C-terminal domain (Ser353-Trp435).  The catalytic domain adopts a distorted (β/α)8 barrel fold similar to that of bee venom hyaluronidase.  Within the catalytic domain, residues such as Tyr247, Asp129, Glu131, Asn350, and Tyr202 play important roles in the cleavage of the β1→4 linkage between N-acetylglucosamine and glucuronic acid units in hyaluronan.

Mechanism 

HYAL1 is responsible for the hydrolysis of intracellular hyaluronan of all sizes into fragments as small as tetrasaccharides.

In the optimal pH state of 4.0, Asp129 and Glu131 share a proton.  Intermolecular resonance in the amide bond in the N-acetylglucosamine unit of the bound hyaluronan polymer leads to a transition state with a positive charge on the nitrogen and an oxyanion nucleophile, which is stabilized by hydrogen bond interactions with Tyr247, that can perform an intramolecular attack on the electrophilic carbon.  This attack forms a 5-membered ring that is stabilized by the negative charge of Asp129 that forms as the leaving hydroxyl group of the glucuronic acid unit takes the proton from Glu131.  The now negatively charged Glu131 is primed to activate a water molecule for the hydrolysis of the intermolecular ring intermediate to restore N-acetylglucosamine.

Tyr202 and Asn350, while not directly involved in the β1→4 linkage cleavage, were identified to be important to HYAL1 function.  HYAL1 uses Tyr202 as a substrate binding determinant and also requires proper glycosylation of Asn350 for full enzymatic function.

The optimal pH range for HYAL1 function is 4.0 to 4.3, though HYAL1 is still 50-80% active at pH 4.5.

Disease Relevance 
HYAL1 is implicated in several types of cancers, likely due to the angiogenic effects of HYAL1-cleaved hyaluronan fragments.  In bladder, prostate, and head and neck carcinomas, elevated hyaluronan and HYAL1 levels are found in tumor cells, tissues, and related body fluids (e.g. urine for bladder cancer and saliva for head and neck cancer).  Urinary hyaluronan and hyaluronidase levels, measured by the HA-HAase test, have ~88% accuracy in detecting bladder cancer, regardless of the tumor grade and stage.

In breast cancer, HYAL1 is also overexpressed in cell lines MDA-MB-231 and MCF-7 and invasive duct cancer tissues and metastatic lymph nodes.  Higher HYAL1 expression has also been detected in primary tumor tissue from patients with subsequent brain metastases versus those without.

See also 
 Hyaluronidase deficiency

References

Further reading 

 
 
 
 
 
 
 
 
 
 
 
 
 
 

